In academia, computational immunology is a field of science that encompasses high-throughput genomic and bioinformatics approaches to immunology. The field's main aim is to convert immunological data into computational problems, solve these problems using mathematical and computational approaches and then convert these results into immunologically meaningful interpretations.

Introduction 

The immune system is a complex system of the human body and understanding it is one of the most challenging topics in biology. Immunology research is important for understanding the mechanisms underlying the defense of human body and to develop drugs for immunological diseases and maintain health. Recent findings in genomic and proteomic technologies have transformed the immunology research drastically. Sequencing of the human and other model organism genomes has produced increasingly large volumes of data relevant to immunology research and at the same time huge amounts of functional and clinical data are being reported in the scientific literature and stored in clinical records. Recent advances in bioinformatics or computational biology were helpful to understand and organize these large-scale data and gave rise to new area that is called Computational immunology or immunoinformatics.

Computational immunology is a branch of bioinformatics and it is based on similar concepts and tools, such as sequence alignment and protein structure prediction tools. Immunomics is a discipline like genomics and proteomics. It is a science, which specifically combines immunology with computer science, mathematics, chemistry, and biochemistry for large-scale analysis of immune system functions. It aims to study the complex protein–protein interactions and networks and allows a better understanding of immune responses and their role during normal, diseased and reconstitution states. Computational immunology is a part of immunomics, which is focused on analyzing large-scale experimental data.

History 

Computational immunology began over 90 years ago with the theoretic modeling of malaria epidemiology. At that time, the emphasis was on the use of mathematics to guide the study of disease transmission. Since then, the field has expanded to cover all other aspects of immune system processes and diseases.

Immunological database 

After the recent advances in sequencing and proteomics technology, there have been many fold increase in generation of molecular and immunological data. The data are so diverse that they can be categorized in different databases according to their use in the research. Until now there are total 31 different immunological databases noted in the Nucleic Acids Research (NAR) Database Collection, which are given in the following table, together with some more immune related databases. The information given in the table is taken from the database descriptions in NAR Database Collection.

Online resources for allergy information are also available on http://www.allergen.org. Such data is valuable for investigation of cross-reactivity between known allergens and analysis of potential allergenicity in proteins. The Structural Database of Allergen Proteins (SDAP) stores information of allergenic proteins. The Food Allergy Research and Resource Program (FARRP) Protein Allergen-Online Database contains sequences of known and putative allergens derived from scientific literature and public databases. Allergome emphasizes the annotation of allergens that result in an IgE-mediated disease.

Tools 
A variety of computational, mathematical and statistical methods are available and reported. These tools are helpful for collection, analysis, and interpretation of immunological data. They include text mining, information management, sequence analysis, analysis of molecular interactions, and mathematical models that enable advanced simulations of immune system and immunological processes. 
Attempts are being made for the extraction of interesting and complex patterns from non-structured text documents in the immunological domain. Such as categorization of allergen cross-reactivity information, identification of cancer-associated gene variants and the classification of immune epitopes.

Immunoinformatics is using the basic bioinformatics tools such as ClustalW, BLAST, and TreeView, as well as specialized immunoinformatics tools, such as EpiMatrix, IMGT/V-QUEST for IG and TR sequence analysis, IMGT/ Collier-de-Perles and IMGT/StructuralQuery for IG variable domain structure analysis. Methods that rely on sequence comparison are diverse and have been applied to analyze HLA sequence conservation, help verify the origins of human immunodeficiency virus (HIV) sequences, and construct homology models for the analysis of hepatitis B virus polymerase resistance to lamivudine and emtricitabine.

There are also some computational models which focus on protein–protein interactions and networks. There are also tools which are used for T and B cell epitope mapping, proteasomal cleavage site prediction, and TAP– peptide prediction. The experimental data is very much important to design and justify the models to predict various molecular targets. Computational immunology tools is the game between experimental data and mathematically designed computational tools.

Applications

Allergies 
Allergies, while a critical subject of immunology, also vary considerably among individuals and sometimes even among genetically similar individuals. The assessment of protein allergenic potential focuses on three main aspects: (i) immunogenicity; (ii) cross-reactivity; and (iii) clinical symptoms. Immunogenicity is due to responses of an IgE antibody-producing B cell and/or of a T cell to a particular allergen. Therefore, immunogenicity studies focus mainly on identifying recognition sites of B-cells and T-cells for allergens. The three-dimensional structural properties of allergens control their allergenicity.

The use of immunoinformatics tools can be useful to predict protein allergenicity and will become increasingly important in the screening of novel foods before their wide-scale release for human use. Thus, there are major efforts under way to make reliable broad based allergy databases and combine these with well validated prediction tools in order to enable the identification of potential allergens in genetically modified drugs and foods. Though the developments are on primary stage, the World Health organization and Food and Agriculture Organization have proposed guidelines for evaluating allergenicity of genetically modified foods. According to the Codex alimentarius, a protein is potentially allergenic if it possesses an identity of ≥6 contiguous amino acids or ≥35% sequence similarity over an 80 amino acid window with a known allergen. Though there are rules, their inherent limitations have started to become apparent and exceptions to the rules have been well reported

Infectious diseases and host responses 

In the study of infectious diseases and host responses, the mathematical and computer models are a great help. These models were very useful in characterizing the behavior and spread of infectious disease, by understanding the dynamics of the pathogen in the host and the mechanisms of host factors which aid pathogen persistence. Examples include Plasmodium falciparum and nematode infection in ruminants.

Much has been done in understanding immune responses to various pathogens by integrating genomics
and proteomics with bioinformatics strategies. Many exciting developments in large-scale screening of pathogens are currently taking place. National Institute of Allergy and Infectious Diseases (NIAID) has initiated an endeavor for systematic mapping of B and T cell epitopes of category A-C pathogens. These pathogens include Bacillus anthracis (anthrax), Clostridium botulinum toxin (botulism), Variola major (smallpox), Francisella tularensis (tularemia), viral hemorrhagic fevers, Burkholderia pseudomallei, Staphylococcus enterotoxin B, yellow fever, influenza, rabies, Chikungunya virus etc. Rule-based systems have been reported for the automated extraction and curation of influenza A records.

This development would lead to the development of an algorithm which would help to identify the conserved regions of pathogen sequences and in turn would be useful for vaccine development. This would be helpful in limiting the spread of infectious disease. Examples include a method for identification of vaccine targets from protein regions of conserved HLA binding and computational assessment of cross-reactivity of broadly neutralizing antibodies against viral pathogens. These examples illustrate the power of immunoinformatics applications to help solve complex problems in public health. Immunoinformatics could accelerate the discovery process dramatically and potentially shorten the time required for vaccine development. Immunoinformatics tools have been used to design the vaccine against SARS-CoV-2, Dengue virus  and Leishmania.

Immune system function 

Using this technology it is possible to know the model behind immune system. It has been used to model T-cell-mediated suppression, peripheral lymphocyte migration, T-cell memory, tolerance, thymic function, and antibody networks. Models are helpful to predicts dynamics of pathogen toxicity and T-cell memory in response to different stimuli. There are also several models which are helpful in understanding the nature of specificity in immune network and immunogenicity.

For example, it was useful to examine the functional relationship between TAP peptide transport and HLA class I antigen presentation. TAP is a transmembrane protein responsible for the transport of antigenic peptides into the endoplasmic reticulum, where MHC class I molecules can bind them and presented to T cells. As TAP does not bind all peptides equally, TAP-binding affinity could influence the ability of a particular peptide to gain access to the MHC class I pathway. Artificial neural network (ANN), a computer model was used to study peptide binding to human TAP and its relationship with MHC class I binding. The affinity of HLA-binding peptides for TAP was found to differ according to the HLA supertype concerned using this method. This research could have important implications for the design of peptide based immuno-therapeutic drugs and vaccines. It shows the power of the modeling approach to understand complex immune interactions.

There exist also methods which integrate peptide prediction tools with computer simulations that can provide detailed information on the immune response dynamics specific to the given pathogen's peptides 
.

Cancer Informatics 

Cancer is the result of somatic mutations which provide cancer cells with a selective growth advantage. Recently it has been very important to determine the novel mutations. Genomics and proteomics techniques are used worldwide to identify mutations related to each specific cancer and their treatments. Computational tools are used to predict growth and surface antigens on cancerous cells. There are publications explaining a targeted approach for assessing mutations and cancer risk. Algorithm CanPredict was used to indicate how closely a specific gene resembles known cancer-causing genes. Cancer immunology has been given so much importance that the data related to it is growing rapidly. Protein–protein interaction networks provide valuable information on tumorigenesis in humans. Cancer proteins exhibit a network topology that is different from normal proteins in the human interactome. Immunoinformatics have been useful in increasing success of tumour vaccination. Recently, pioneering works have been conducted to analyse the host immune system dynamics in response to artificial immunity induced by vaccination strategies. Other simulation tools use predicted cancer peptides to forecast immune specific anticancer responses that is dependent on the specified HLA.
These resources are likely to grow significantly in the near future and immunoinformatics will be a major growth area in this domain.

See also
Computational biology
Immunology
Genetics
Cancer
Immunity

References

External links 
 Boston University Center for Computational Immunology
 York Computational Immunology Lab
 Immunoinformatics Immunological Software and Web Services from Gajendra Pal Singh Raghava group
 VacTarBac A web based platform for predicted vaccine candidates against major pathogens.

Bioinformatics
Branches of immunology
Genomics
Computational fields of study